The 2008 Coppa Italia Final was the final match of the 2007–08 Coppa Italia, the 61st season of the top cup competition in Italian football. The match was played on 24 May 2008, between defending champions A.S. Roma and Internazionale at the Stadio Olimpico in Rome. This was the fourth consecutive and total final between these two clubs. Roma successfully defended their title as cup winners, defeating Inter by a score of 2–1.

For the first time since 1980, the final was played as a single match on neutral territory.

Match

References 

Coppa Italia Final 2008
Coppa Italia Finals
Coppa Italia Final 2008
Coppa Italia Final 2008
Coppa Italia Final 2008
Coppa Italia Final 2008